Herbert Alden Pasche (July 19, 1910 – May 9, 1986) was the first head coach of the Houston Cougars men's basketball team from 1945 to 1956.  Pasche also served of as an assistant coach for the Houston Cougars football program as a line coach from 1946 to 1947.  While at the university, Pasche served as an associate professor of health and physical education.  Pasche was a 1932 graduate of Rice University, where he played football as an end for the Rice Owls.

During Pasche's tenure, he posted a 135–116 record. Under his leadership in 1949, the Cougars won the Gulf Coast Conference championship.  College Basketball Hall of famer coach Guy V. Lewis played for Pasche, and eventually became an assistant coach before being handed the job upon Alden Pasche's retirement.

Head coaching record

References

1910 births
1986 deaths
American men's basketball coaches
American men's basketball players
Basketball coaches from Texas
Basketball players from Texas
Houston Cougars football coaches
Houston Cougars men's basketball coaches
Rice Owls football players